Centerport is a borough in north central Berks County, Pennsylvania. The population was 387 at the 2010 census. The borough is in the Schuylkill Valley School District.

Geography
Centerport is located at  (40.486726, -76.007190). It drains southeastward to the nearby Schuylkill River.

Transportation

No numbered highways pass through Centerport. Main thoroughfares in the borough include Main Street, Centerport Road, Bernville Road and Shartlesville Road. The nearest state highway is Pennsylvania Route 61, which passes two miles to the east.

Demographics

As of the 2000 census, there were 387 people, 149 households, and 107 families living in the borough. The population density was 1,935 people per square mile (758.8/km2). There were 150 housing units at an average density of 750 per square mile (294.1/km2). The racial makeup of the borough was 96.4% White, 0.5% African American, 0.5% Native American, and 2.6% from other races.. Hispanic or Latino of any race were 3.6% of the population.

There were 149 households, out of which 29.5% had children under the age of 18 living with them, 51.7% were married couples living together, 11.4% had a female householder with no husband present, and 28.2% were non-families. 21.5% of all households were made up of individuals, and 6.7% had someone living alone who was 65 years of age or older. The average household size was 2.60 and the average family size was 2.93.

In the borough, the population was spread out, with 24.0% under the age of 18, 9.6% from 18 to 24, 25.8% from 25 to 44, 24.6% from 45 to 64, and 16% who were 65 years of age or older. The median age was 37.9 years. Males made up 49.1% of the population and females made up 50.9%.

The median income for a household in the borough was $47,115, and the median income for a family was $51,250. Males had a median income of $30,938 versus $23,750 for females. The per capita income for the borough was $20,927. About 2.3% of families and 4.6% of the population were below the poverty line, including 3.3% of those under age 18 and 6.4% of those age 65 or over.

Landmarks
Centerport is known for having a literal nine foot tall fork in the road at the intersection of Main Street and Centerport Roadd.

Gallery

References

External links

Boroughs in Berks County, Pennsylvania
Boroughs in Pennsylvania
1818 establishments in Pennsylvania
Populated places established in 1818